Indian tribal police are police officers hired by Native American tribes. The largest tribal police agency is the Navajo Nation Police Department and the second largest is the Cherokee Nation Marshal Service.

History
In the early 1800s the Cherokee Nation established "regulating companies" with appointed regulators to combat horse theft and other crimes. On November 18, 1844, the Cherokee Nation established the first Lighthorse company, a unit of mounted tribal policemen referred to as Lighthorsemen. In 1820 the Choctaw Lighthorse was established. The Creek and Seminole tribes also established lighthorses before the "Five Civilized Tribes" lost their lands in the 19th century the lighthorses were disbanded.

In 1869 the US Indian Agent to the Sac and Fox and Iowa Tribes appointed American Indians as policemen. This is the first record of a federally sponsored Indian police force and was the first of the Indian Agency Police. Indian Agency Police were tasked with the enforcement of federal laws, treaty regulations, and law and order on Indian agency land. At the time very few tribes had tribal government, and therefore no tribal laws or police forces, thus the Indian Agents and their officers were often the only form of law enforcement in Indian Country.

Description
Tribal police historically had several different titles—sheriffs, constables, regulators, lighthorsemen —and today work closely with local, state, and federal police agencies.

See also
 Aboriginal Police in Canada
 Bureau of Indian Affairs Police
 Indian agency police
 United States Indian Police

References

Native American tribal police